Croker Bay (originally: Croker's Bay) is an Arctic waterway in Qikiqtaaluk Region, Nunavut, Canada. It lies off the southern coast of Devon Island in the eastern high Arctic. Like Maxwell Bay to the west, it is an arm of Lancaster Sound and Barrow Strait.

Croker's Bay was named by William Edward Parry in honor of John Wilson Croker.

References

Bays of Qikiqtaaluk Region